The House of Chikovani was a Georgian princely (mtavari) house. Dukes of Chikovani ruled a historic province, Lechkhumi in northwestern Georgia. At the end of the 17th century, General Katso Chikovani rose to prominence in Mingrelia, a western Georgian principality. After him, his son became the ruler and assumed the dynastic name of Dadiani.

History

The House of Chikovani first came to prominence after General Katzo Chikovani (d. 1682), Prince of Salipartiano, was promoted to the post of the Chief Minister at the court of Levan III of Mingrelia. 

As he strengthened his position among the nobles of western Georgia, General Chikovani eliminated members of many prominent houses, including those of the ruling Dadiani House. When Levan III died in 1681 without leaving a male heir, his natural son Levan IV was forced to abdicate, and General Chikovani'son took over the leadership of the Principality of Mingrelia. General Chikovani's increased power facilitated the ascent of his son George to the Mingrelian Throne. George became a ruler of the principality and after adopting the title of Dadiani became known as George IV Dadiani of Mingrelia.

Beginning with George IV till Nikolas Dadiani, Prince of Mingrelia, all members of the ruling Dadiani family were by blood members of the House of Chikovani. The lineage lasted until the principality was abolished in late 1800s by the Russian Empire which took advantage of internal instability, Ottoman Invasions during the Crimean War, and a subsequent request for help from Ekaterine Dadiani, the Last Princess of Mingrelia.

The Chikovani branch that remained without the ruling title of Dadiani traces its origins to General Chikovani's second son Jesse who did not assume the dynastic title.

Notable descendents
Simon Chikovani - futurist poet and political figure.
Giorgi Kvinitadze - military commander who rose from an officer in the Imperial Russian army to commander-in-chief of the Democratic Republic of Georgia. Descended through his father, Colonel Ivane Chikovani.
 Lela Chikovani - Deputy Defense Minister of Georgia.
 Vakhtang Vladimiris dze Chikovani ru - Hero of the Soviet Union
 Archil Chikovani - Mayor of Batumi.

Historical gallery

Related
House of Dadiani
Principality of Mingrelia
Salipartiano

References

External links 
 

Noble families of Georgia (country)
Families of Georgia (country)